Saint Mary's High School (SMHS), founded in 1876, is a Roman Catholic, co-educational, college preparatory school in Stockton, California. The school is under the canonical  jurisdiction of the Diocese of Stockton and sponsored by the Salesian order of the Oblates of St. Francis de Sales priests and brothers (Toledo–Ohio Province). The school is a member of the College Board and is accredited by the Western Association of Schools and Colleges and by the Western Catholic Education Association.

History
St. Mary's roots go back to 1876 when St. Agnes Academy opened as a boarding and free day school for girls, grades 1–12. The faculty then consisted of seven Dominican Sisters and 95 students. A separate corporation sole within the Diocese of Stockton, St. Mary's is a co-ed secondary school that has a student body of 926 and a faculty and support staff totaling over 110.

St. Mary's High School has had a religious presence of Priests, Brothers, and Sisters throughout its history. The Dominican Sisters of San Rafael have been joined by the Brothers of Mary, a number of Franciscan Friars, diocesan priests, the Sisters of the Blessed Virgin Mary, and the Oblates of St. Francis de Sales.

Lay men and women have contributed to the strengthening of the school's curriculum. The faculty teach in 10 disciplines, offering over 130 courses in theology, English, social studies, mathematics, physical education, science, computer resources, foreign languages, business and vocational arts, and fine arts. There are also 27 cocurricular activities and teams in 15 sports.

Campus

There is a residence on campus for the priests and brothers associated with the Oblates of St. Francis de Sales (Toledo–Ohio Province). The Cortopassi Aquatics Center, which opened September 2007, is home for the St. Mary's Aquatic Sports Program. The Chase Family Fitness Center, a  weight-training facility, supplements the Sprague Family Athletic Building.

Approximately 81% of the student body identify themselves as Catholic. The faculty consists of 1 religious Oblate Priest and 110 lay teachers and support staff. Average classroom size being 25.

Academics
There are ten departments at St. Mary's from which students choose their required and elective courses: Theology, English, Social Studies, Mathematics, Physical Education & Health, Science, Computer, Foreign Language, and Fine Arts. In addition, students may take courses for high school and college credit at San Joaquin Delta Community College or University of the Pacific.

Advanced Placement courses are offered in American Literature, English Literature, Chemistry, European History, U.S. History, U.S. Government, Psychology, Calculus and Biology. Honors courses are offered in Algebra, Biology, Chemistry, English, Geometry/Trigonometry, Physical Science, Pre-Calculus and World Literature.

As part of the religious focus of the school, each student is required to participate in a Community Service program upon graduation.

Admission 
Admission to St. Mary's is selective and based on a placement test, previous school record and recommendation. Transfer students are accepted on an individual basis after consideration of their high school transcripts and interviews. St. Mary's draws students from 64 local elementary and junior high schools.

Co-curricular activities
St. Mary's hosts clubs and organizations focusing on creativity, leadership, scholarship, and service. Student athletes compete in the Tri-City Athletic Association in football, volleyball, water polo, lacrosse, soccer, tennis, basketball, wrestling, baseball, softball, cross-country, track, swimming/diving, badminton, and golf.

Band
Saint Mary's High School features two main bands (jazz and symphonic) who play throughout the area and the state at competitions such as The Lincoln Band Review and The Heritage Festival in Anaheim, California.

Notable alumni

Jason Bartlett, 1997 former MLB shortstop. Twins, Padres, Tampa Bay Rays
Barry Enright, Major League Baseball pitcher
Chelsea Gray, professional basketball player for WNBA's Los Angeles Sparks and Las Vegas Aces, 2× WNBA champion (2016, 2022)
Von Hayes, former MLB outfielder, All-Star
Kyle Jensen, Major League Baseball player
Ty Kelly, American-Israeli Major League Baseball player
Doug Martin, running back for NFL's Oakland Raiders
Pete Morelli, NFL referee, Saint Mary's President
Mark Payne, professional basketball player
Dawson Perry, mayor of Victor, California
Gary Podesto, businessman, former Stockton mayor
Ed Sprague Jr., former MLB third baseman, All-Star, 2× World Series champion
Gabe Vincent, basketball player for NBA's Miami Heat
Mitch Walding, MLB third baseman
Eric Williams, former NFL defensive lineman, Super Bowl XXVI champion

External links

Notes and references

Catholic secondary schools in California
Educational institutions established in 1876
High schools in San Joaquin County, California
Education in Stockton, California
1876 establishments in California
Roman Catholic Diocese of Stockton